The 1988 Utah Utes football team represented the University of Utah as a member of the Western Athletic Conference (WAC) during the 1988 NCAA Division I-A football season.  In their fourth season under head coach Jim Fassel, the Utes compiled an overall record of 6–5 with a mark of 4–4 against conference opponents, finished in fifth place in the WAC, and were outscored by their opponents 399 to 357. The team played home games at Robert Rice Stadium in Salt Lake City.

Utah's statistical leaders included Scott Mitchell with 4,322 passing yards, Eddie Johnson with 748 rushing yards, and Carl Harry with 1,145 receiving yards.

Schedule

Roster

References

Utah
Utah Utes football seasons
Utah Utes football